Uzi Yairi (31 July 1936 – 5 March 1975, Tel Aviv, Israel) was a commander of the elite Israeli army commando unit Sayeret Matkal. He was killed in action during a counter-terrorism operation to free hostages held by Palestinian terrorists at the Savoy Hotel.

Yairi became head of Sayeret Matkal at age 31 and a full colonel at only 35. He also served as a brigade commander during the Yom Kippur War, but left the army as a result of trauma he had suffered during the war. Тo commemorate him, moshav Ro'i was named after him. The name is an acronym for Ramat Uzi Yairi.

References

Israeli soldiers
1936 births
1975 deaths
Israeli military personnel killed in action
Burials at Kiryat Shaul Cemetery